Harriot (or Harriott}was launched in Liverpool in 1786. For many years she was a West Indiaman, sailing between Liverpool and Barbados. In 1796 a French frigate captured her, but the British Royal Navy quickly recaptured her. She became a slave ship. At the beginning of her of her first slave trading voyage a French privateer captured her, and again the Royal Navy quickly recaptured her. She made five slave trading voyages in all. Thereafter she traded with South America. She was last listed in 1814 with stale data.

Career
Harriot first appeared in Lloyd's Register (LR) in 1789.

On 28 February 1793 Captain Robert Hunter Caitcheon acquired a letter of marque. War with France had just broken out and from her armament, though not from the size of her crew, it appears that Harriet was prepared to take prizes should the opportunity to do so occur.

On 11 March Harriet and Speightown, Hall, master, recaptured Camilla, Dunbar, master, of Leith. A French privateer of 14 guns and 75 men had captured Camilla as she was sailing from Salonica to London. Camilla was carrying a cargo of 475 bales of cotton, 25 bales of spunge, 675 boxes of figs, and 12 tons of valonia.

On 5 April Harriet became the first privateer from Liverpool to send in to Liverpool a French prize. The prize was the brig Agreeable. P.M.Culler, master, which had been sailing from Port-au-Prince to Bordeaux. Agreeable, of 150 tons burthen, was carrying a cargo of coffee, sugar, indigo, and cotton, and the report of her capture valued vessel and cargo at £6–9000. The report also gave the name of Harriets owner as Barton. The auctioneers Ewart & Ruston, of Exchange Alley, sold vessel and cargo.

On her next voyage Harriet chased a French Guineaman (slave ship) into Martinique but had to give up the chase when fired upon by the fort there.

In 1796 Harriot was to windward of Barbados when a French frigate captured her.  recaptured her. Harriot was sailing to Barbados from Liverpool and Pelican sent her into Martinique.  

A report in 1798 stated Harriet had made 33 voyages to Barbados in the previous ten years and had taken and retaken several vessels and had been lengthened in that time, "an instance of commercial expedition,... scarcely to be paralleled."

1st slave voyage (1798–1799): Captain William Lace acquired a letter of marque on 24 September 1798. On 29 October Captain Lace sailed from Liverpool, bound for the coast of what is now Angola Harriot acquired her slaves at Ambriz and arrived  at Barbados on 12 July 1799 with 313 slaves. She sailed from Barbados on 24 July and arrived back at Liverpool on 3 September. She had left with 36 crew members and suffered two crew deaths on her voyage.

2nd slave voyage (1799–1801): Captain Matthew Cusack sailed from Liverpool on 15 November 1799. Shortly after Cusack set out, a French privateer captured Harriot. A British Royal Navy frigate recaptured Harriot on 3 December, and Harriot came into Cork. Later, Cusack and Harriot returned to their voyage. In late 1800 Harriot and  recaptured  which had been captured as Jane was sailing from Liverpool to Africa. Her recaptors sent Jane back to Liverpool.  Harriot acquired her slaves in the Sierra Leone estuary. She stopped at St Thomas and arrived in the Bahamas in May 1801. There she was sold.  From the Bahamas she sailed to Charleston. Harriot, Cusack, master, returned to Liverpool from Charleston on 20 July. 

3rd slave voyage (1801–1802): Captain John Flinn sailed from Liverpool on 11 November 1801. Harriet acquired her slaves at the Gambia and arrived at Trinidad on 13 April 1802 with 206 slaves. She sailed from Trinidad on 20 June and arrived back at Liverpool on 21 August. She had left Liverpool with 34 crew members and she suffered six crew death on her voyage.

 

4th slave voyage (1802–1804): Captain Richard Everett sailed from Liverpool on 3 October 1802.. She arrived at Barbados and then sailed for St Vincent. Harriot finally arrived at Tortola on 12 December 1803 with 186 slaves. She was sold in Tortola.  She sailed for Liverpool on 20 June 1804, and arrived back there on 6 August. She had left Liverpool with 20 crew members and she suffered eight crew deaths on her voyage.

5th slave voyage (1804-1805): Captain Everett sailed from Liverpool on 27 October 1804, bound for West Africa. Harriot arrived at St Lucia on 3 Ma 1805 with 219 slaves. She arrived back at Liverpool on 9 November. 

When Harriet, Everitt, master returned to Liverpool from Africa and St Lucia her cargo consisted of 176 elephants' teeth, 1900 billets of redwood, 174 hogsheads of sugar, 167 bales of cotton, six cases of coffee, five dozen coconuts, and one barrel of sugar for Everitt's personal account.

It consisted of 8600 ox and cow hides, and 60 "murquitos" or bales of tallow.<ref>"Multiple Advertisements and Notices". Lancaster Gazette and General Advertiser, for Lancashire, Westmorland, &c. (Lancaster, England), 9 January 1808; pg. [1]; Issue 343.</ref> 

On 8 June 1808 Captain Thomas Hammond acquired a letter of marque.

FateHarriet was last listed in LR'' in 1814 with data unchanged for over five years.

Notes and citations
Notes

Citations

References
 
 
  
1786 ships
Age of Sail merchant ships of England
Liverpool slave ships
Captured ships